Frank Connolly is an Irish journalist, author, and communications manager with the trade union SIPTU. 

Connolly grew up in Dublin and attended Trinity College Dublin. He previously worked for the Sunday Business Post, Ireland on Sunday, Village Magazine and Irish Mail on Sunday.

His brother Niall is one of the Irish Republicans arrested in Colombia known as the Colombia Three. He is known for his investigative journalism especially while at the Sunday Business Post, his investigation into planning in Dublin led to the Planning Tribunals.

Connolly was an executive director in 2005 of the short-lived Centre for Public Inquiry (funded by Chuck Feeney's, Atlantic Philanthropies), which closed following controversy over his alleged trip to Colombia.

He was accused under Dáil Éireann privilege by Justice Minister Michael McDowell of traveling to Columbia using a false passport with his brother Niall and IRA Chief Padraig Wilson.

In 2009 he became the head of communications for the trade union SIPTU.

References

Irish journalists
Business Post people
People from County Dublin
Alumni of Trinity College Dublin
Year of birth missing (living people)
Living people